Essam Baheeg (26 February 1931 – 4 December 2008) was an Egyptian footballer who played as a winger for Zamalek. He also played for the Egyptian national team, and represented his country and was part of the team that won the 1959 Africa Cup of Nations.

Career statistics

International goals

Honours

Player
Egypt
 Africa Cup of Nations: (1)
 1959

Zamalek SC
Egypt Cup: (5)
 1951–52, 1954–55, 1956–57, 1957–58, 1958–59
Cairo League: (3)
 1950–51, 1951–52, 1952–53

Head coach
Zamalek SC
Egyptian Premier League: (1)
 1987–88
Egypt Cup: (1)
 1987–88
Afro-Asian Club Championship: (1)
 1987

Artistic activity
He appeared at the movie Talk of the City (Hadeeth Al-Madina ) in 1964.

References

External links

1931 births
2008 deaths
Egyptian footballers
Egypt international footballers
Zamalek SC players
1959 African Cup of Nations players
Africa Cup of Nations-winning players
Footballers at the 1955 Mediterranean Games
Mediterranean Games gold medalists for Egypt
Zamalek SC managers
Sportspeople from Alexandria
Egyptian Premier League players
Mediterranean Games medalists in football
Association football wingers
Egyptian football managers
20th-century Egyptian people